This is a complete list of soil science licensing boards in the United States. State licensing in this context refers to any state regulatory program which limits the professional practice of soil science within state jurisdiction to individuals qualified by the state.

Registration  and certification of professional soil scientists required by law is treated as licensure in the context of this list even when the term licensing is not utilized provided that the state uses that registration or certification to restrict professional practice of soil science.

State Licensing Programs
Alabama Board of Registration for Professional Soil Classifiers
Arkansas Board of Registration for Professional Soil Classifiers
Delaware
Georgia Licensing Board for Professional Soil Scientists
Indiana Indiana Registry of Soil Scientists
Maine Board Of Certification For Geologists and Soil Scientists
Minnesota Board of AELSLAGID
Mississippi Bureau of Plant Industry Performs functions similar to a state licensing board.
New Hampshire Board of Certification for Natural Scientists
North Carolina Board for Licensing Soil Scientists
North Dakota Board of Registration for Professional Soil Scientists
South Carolina Soil Classifiers Advisory Council Performs functions similar to a state licensing board. 
Tennessee
Texas Board of Professional Geoscientists
Virginia Board for Professional Soil Scientists and Wetland Professionals
Wisconsin Soil Science Section, Joint Board of Professional Geologists, Hydrologists and Soil Scientists

See also
Soil Science Society of America

External links
Steps to Achieving Licensing in Your State (pdf)
United States Consortium of Soil Science Associations Soil Science Licensing Questionnaire (MSWord) and Survey Results 2002 
National Society of Consulting Soil Scientists Article: Requirements for Licensed Soil Scientists: State-by-State Comparisons 2004

References

Licenses
Professional titles and certifications
Soil and crop science organizations
Soil science-related lists
Soil science licensing boards
Soil science licensing boards